Estadio Rómulo Shaw Cisneros is a multi-use stadium in Chancay District, Huaral, Peru. It is currently used mostly for football matches and is the home stadium of Deportivo Coopsol of the Peruvian Segunda División. The stadium holds 3,000 spectators

Romulo Shaw Cisneros
Buildings and structures in Lima Region